The 2018 UEFA Women's Under-17 Championship qualifying competition was a women's under-17 football competition that determined the seven teams joining the automatically qualified hosts Lithuania in the 2018 UEFA Women's Under-17 Championship final tournament.

Apart from Lithuania, 45 of the remaining 54 UEFA member national teams entered the qualifying competition. Players born on or after 1 January 2001 are eligible to participate. Each match has a duration of 80 minutes, consisting of two halves of 40 minutes with a 15-minute half-time.

Format
The qualifying competition consists of two rounds:
Qualifying round: Apart from Germany, which receive a bye to the elite round as the team with the highest seeding coefficient, the remaining 44 teams are drawn into 11 groups of four teams. Each group is played in single round-robin format at one of the teams selected as hosts after the draw. The 11 group winners, the 11 runners-up, and the five third-placed teams with the best record against the first and second-placed teams in their group advance to the elite round.
Elite round: The 28 teams are drawn into seven groups of four teams. Each group is played in single round-robin format at one of the teams selected as hosts after the draw. The seven group winners qualify for the final tournament.

Initially the elite round would consist of 24 teams, drawn into six groups of four teams, with the six group winners and the runner-up with the best record against the first and third-placed teams in their group qualifying for the final tournament. After the qualifying round draw was held, UEFA decided to expand the elite round from 24 to 28 teams, allowing four more third-placed teams to advance to the elite round.

The schedule of each mini-tournament is as follows (Regulations Article 20.04):

Tiebreakers
In the qualifying round and elite round, teams are ranked according to points (3 points for a win, 1 point for a draw, 0 points for a loss), and if tied on points, the following tiebreaking criteria are applied, in the order given, to determine the rankings (Regulations Articles 14.01 and 14.02):
Points in head-to-head matches among tied teams;
Goal difference in head-to-head matches among tied teams;
Goals scored in head-to-head matches among tied teams;
If more than two teams are tied, and after applying all head-to-head criteria above, a subset of teams are still tied, all head-to-head criteria above are reapplied exclusively to this subset of teams;
Goal difference in all group matches;
Goals scored in all group matches;
Penalty shoot-out if only two teams have the same number of points, and they met in the last round of the group and are tied after applying all criteria above (not used if more than two teams have the same number of points, or if their rankings are not relevant for qualification for the next stage);
Disciplinary points (red card = 3 points, yellow card = 1 point, expulsion for two yellow cards in one match = 3 points);
UEFA coefficient for the qualifying round draw;
Drawing of lots.

To determine the five best third-placed teams from the qualifying round, the results against the teams in fourth place are discarded. The following criteria are applied (Regulations Article 15.01):
Points;
Goal difference;
Goals scored;
Disciplinary points;
UEFA coefficient for the qualifying round draw;
Drawing of lots.

Qualifying round

Draw
The draw for the qualifying round was held on 11 November 2016, 09:10 CET (UTC+1), at the UEFA headquarters in Nyon, Switzerland.

The teams were seeded according to their coefficient ranking, calculated based on the following:
2014 UEFA Women's Under-17 Championship final tournament and qualifying competition (qualifying round and elite round)
2015 UEFA Women's Under-17 Championship final tournament and qualifying competition (qualifying round and elite round)
2016 UEFA Women's Under-17 Championship final tournament and qualifying competition (qualifying round and elite round)

Each group contained one team from Pot A, one team from Pot B, one team from Pot C, and one team from Pot D. For political reasons, Russia and Ukraine would not be drawn in the same group.

Notes
Teams marked in bold have qualified for the final tournament.

Groups
The qualifying round must be played between 1 August and 29 October 2017.

Times up to 28 October 2017 are CEST (UTC+2), thereafter times are CET (UTC+1).

Group 1

Group 2

Group 3

Group 4

Group 5

Group 6

Group 7

Group 8

Group 9

Group 10

Group 11

Ranking of third-placed teams
To determine the five best third-placed teams from the qualifying round which advance to the elite round, only the results of the third-placed teams against the first and second-placed teams in their group are taken into account.

Elite round

Draw
The draw for the elite round was held on 24 November 2017, 11:45 CET (UTC+1), at the UEFA headquarters in Nyon, Switzerland.

The teams were seeded according to their results in the qualifying round. Germany, which received a bye to the elite round, were automatically seeded into Pot A. Each group contained one team from Pot A, one team from Pot B, one team from Pot C, and one team from Pot D. Winners and runners-up from the same qualifying round group could not be drawn in the same group, but the best third-placed teams could be drawn in the same group as winners or runners-up from the same qualifying round group.

Groups
The elite round must be played between 1 February and 1 April 2018.

Times up to 24 March 2018 are CET (UTC+1), thereafter times are CEST (UTC+2).

Group 1

Group 2

Group 3

Group 4

Group 5

Group 6

Group 7

Qualified teams
The following eight teams qualified for the final tournament.

1 Bold indicates champions for that year. Italic indicates hosts for that year.

Goalscorers
15 goals

 Clàudia Pina

10 goals

 Telma Encarnação

8 goals

 Madeline Roth
 Romée Leuchter
 Nikita Tromp

6 goals

 Celina Degen
 Lauren James
 Jess Park
 Beata Olsson

5 goals

 Karlijn Knapen
 Aino Vuorinen
 Eva Navarro

4 goals

 Jessica Frieser
 Linda Mittermair
 Maria Plattner
 Kristina Tikhvodova
 Kirstine Roland Lykke
 Annabel Blanchard
 Jenna Topra
 Nóra Szélpál
 Anna Østrem
 Elisabeth Terland
 Paulina Tomasiak
 Emilija Ema Petrović
 Bruna Vilamala
 Chiara Messerli
 Sara Lilja Vidlund

3 goals

 Lisa Kolb
 Klára Cvrčková
 Kateřina Marcinková
 Hannah Griffin
 Ebony Salmon
 Malaury Craff
 Julie Dufour
 Jaimy Ravensbergen
 Adriana Achcińska
 Paulina Filipczak
 Agnieszka Glinka
 Sónia Costa
 Ana Barjaktarović
 Irene López
 Ainhoa Marín
 María Isabel Okoye
 Kajsa Lang
 Emma Paulsson
 Anja Kerr
 Melike Öztürk
 Oksana Bilokur
 Elise Hughes

2 goals

 Julia Wagner
 Anastasiya Zheleznikova
 Romy Camps
 Marith De Bondt
 Talitha De Groote
 Hannah Eurlings
 Zenia Mertens
 Anna Šubrtová
 Emma Snerle
 Kaisa Juvonen
 Jenni Kantanen
 Maïté Boucly
 Kessya Bussy
 Grace Kazadi Ntambwe
 Emilie Bernhardt
 Vanessa Fudalla
 Greta Stegemann
 Vanessza Nagy
 Arna Eiríksdóttir
 Karólína Jack
 Sveindís Jane Jónsdóttir
 Clara Sigurðardóttir
 Karólína Lea Vilhjálmsdóttir
 Serena Landa
 Sara Tamborini
 Martina Tomaselli
 Kirsten van de Westeringh
 Megan Bell
 Emilie Bragstad
 Eline Hegg
 Mia Rostad Huse
 Runa Lillegård
 Marthine Østenstad
 Andreia Jacinto
 Daniela Santos
 Francisca Silva
 Ana Isabel Teles
 Kristina Komissarova
 Elena Santoyo-Brown
 Andjela Krstić
 Nikolina Plavšić
 Alexandra Tejová
 Ana Milovič
 Lisa Johansson
 Tilde Lindwall
 Fiona Sturgess
 Benan Altıntaş
 Iryna Kotiash
 Emily Jones
 Tamsyn Sibanda

1 goal

 Marie Therese Höbinger
 Jana Kofler
 Annabel Schasching
 Claudia Wenger
 Laura Wurzer
 Dilara Soley Deli
 Nigar Mirzaliyeva
 Karina Stankevich
 Esther Buabadi
 Valérie Schuilen
 Jarne Teulings
 Tess Wils
 Andrea Gavrić
 Sofija Krajšumović
 Fadila Mujkić
 Đula Velagić
 Gabriela Naydenova
 Lara Lucić
 Tereza Ličmanová
 Aneta Pochmanová
 Cecilie Christensen
 Josefine Hasbo
 Olivia Møller Holdt
 Cecilie Larsen
 Julie Madsen
 Pedersen Pernille
 Simran Jhamat
 Missy Bo Kearns
 Jensa Kannuberg Tórolvsdóttir
 Annika Huhta
 Katariina Kosola
 Dana Leskinen
 Marie Mäkinen
 Oona Siren
 Naomie Feller
 Margaux Le Mouël
 Clara Moreira
 Manon Revelli
 Orane Schmeler
 Sarah Zahot
 Chloé Zubieta
 Anna Aehling
 Gia Corley
 Ivana Fuso
 Shekiera Martinez
 Dimitra Proxenou
 Dorottya Czellér
 Beatrix Fördős
 Vivien Pintye
 Sára Pusztai
 Bernadett Stefán
 Fanni Vachter
 Hildur Thóra Hákonardóttir
 Helena Ósk Hálfdánardóttir
 Diljá Ýr Zomers
 Dima Al Ramhe
 Irena Kuznezov
 Eliana Jenny Nelson-Levy
 Melissa Bellucci
 Teresa Fracas
 Maria Grazia Ladu
 Sara Velkova
 Maria Farrugia
 Celeste Grech
 Đurđevac Nađa
 Chasity Grant
 Isa van der Linde
 Leah McEvoy
 Julie Blakstad
 Sara Kanutte Fornes
 Zofia Buszewska
 Kinga Kozak
 Alexis Legowski
 Paulina Oleksiak
 Maria Dias
 Luana Marques
 Isibeal Atkinson
 Amy Boyle-Carr
 Ciara Fowler
 Megan Mackey
 Louise Masterson
 Tyler Toland
 Emily Whelan
 Carmen Marcu
 Alsu Abdullina
 Anastasiya Kulakova
 Daria Solonovich
 Morgan Cross
 Leah Fleming
 Sadie Mitchell
 Milica Bulatović
 Milica Radić
 Živana Stupar
 Patrícia Gašparovičová
 Stela Semanová
 Kaja Korošec
 Luana Zajmi
 Vita Žolek
 Paula Arana
 Aida Esteve
 Paola Hernández
 Salma Paralluelo
 Leire Peña
 Saga Jontoft
 Johanna Lindell
 Wilma Ljung Klingwall
 Ebba Sjögren
 Elsa Törnblom
 Julia Walentowicz
 Svenja Fölmli
 Elif Keskin
 Dilan Yeşim Taşkın
 Alina Godunko
 Polina Yanchuk
 Amina Vine

1 own goal

 Renāte Gaugere (against Slovakia)
 Ivana Nikolova (against Serbia)
 Nicole Sciberras (against Finland)
 Dženita Ramčilović (against Iceland)
 Marija Vukanić (against Spain)
 Lotte Fikseth Fossem (against England)
 Adriana Achcińska (against Switzerland)
 Ioana Edvina Ciontos (against Belgium)
 Adelina Rusu (against Portugal)
 Natalija Vorkapić (against Czech Republic)
 Julia Walentowicz (against Finland)
 Romana Lukach (against Poland)

References

External links

Qualification
2018
2017 in women's association football
2018 in women's association football
2017 in youth association football
2018 in youth association football
September 2017 sports events in Europe
October 2017 sports events in Europe
March 2018 sports events in Europe